Gamma-aminobutyric acid receptor subunit alpha-6 is a protein that in humans is encoded by the GABRA6 gene.

GABA is the major inhibitory neurotransmitter in the mammalian brain where it acts at GABA-A receptors, which are ligand-gated chloride channels. Chloride conductance of these channels can be modulated by agents such as benzodiazepines that bind to the GABA-A receptor. At least 16 distinct subunits of GABA-A receptors have been identified.

One study has found a genetic variant in the gene to be associated with the personality trait neuroticism.

See also
 GABAA receptor

References

Further reading

External links 
 

Ion channels